Jian'ou is a county-level city in Nanping in northern Fujian province, China. Under the name Jianning (Kienning), it was formerly the seat of its own prefecture and was the namesake of its province.

The Jian'ou dialect, a dialect of Northern Min, is spoken in Jian'ou.

History

The city was established in 196 under the name Jian'an – the era name of the reigning Emperor Xian of Han. Along with Fuzhou, they were the earliest-established Chinese territories in the area and thus their province bears their conjoined names: Fu & Jian. The city was once the capital of the Fujian region and also served as the capital of the kingdom of Yin in AD 943. In the Song dynasty, Jian'an became the seat of Jianning Prefecture (Jianning-fu).

Jian'ou was visited by Marco Polo in 1291 on his way from Hangzhou to Quanzhou. In his Travels, dictated seven years later to a scribe writing in Old French, the name Jianning-fu is romanised as Quenlinfu. The city is, he says,
"of considerable size, and contains three very handsome bridges, upwards of a hundred paces in length and eight paces in width. The men of the place are very handsome, and live in a state of luxurious ease. There is much raw silk produced here and it is manufactured into silk pieces of various sorts. Cottons are also woven of coloured threads, which are carried for sale to every part of the province of Mangi. The people employ themselves extensively, and export quantities of ginger and galangal. I have been told, but did not myself see the animal, that there are found at this place a species of domestic fowls which have no feathers, their skins being clothed with black hair, resembling the fur of cats. Such a sight must be extraordinary. They lay eggs like other fowls, and they are good to eat. The multitude of tigers renders traveling through the country dangerous, unless a number of persons go in company."Under the Yuan Dynasty, the name was changed from Jianning-Fu to Jianning-Lu. This was a result of an administrative restructuring: formerly, Jian'ou was the capital of the local fu, or prefecture. Jian'ou was made the capital of the local lu, a collection of prefectures still smaller than a province, and was renamed Jianning-Lu accordingly.

Administration

4 Subdistricts 
Ouning Street Office: Qilijie Village, Shuixi Village
Zhishan Street Office: Xida Village, Haodong Village, Mawen Village
Jian'an Street Office: Dong'an Village, Dongmen Village, Qianjie Community
Tongji Street Office: Sanmen Village, Nanmen Village, Dongxi Village, Qiaonan Community, Nanmen Community, Taozhu Community

10 Towns 
Xudun
Jiyang
Fangdao
Dongyou
Xiaoqiao
Yushan
Nanya
Dikou
Xiaosong
Dongfeng

4 Townships 
Chuanshi
Shunyang
Shuiyuan
Longcun

Climate

Transportation
 Railway: Hengfeng–Nanping Railway, Hefei-Fuzhou High-Speed Railway
 Highway: G205, G25 Changchun-Shenzhen Expressway, G3 Beijing–Taipei Expressway
 Coach Station: Jian'ou Station

Specialty 
 Fangcun Kompia
 Xiaosong Bianrou: originated from Hutou Village, Xiaosong Town
 Fumao Cellar Spirit
 Zhuili chestnut
 Pressed salted duck

Notable people 
 Li Qiumei

Scenic

Notes

References

External links

Cities in Fujian
County-level divisions of Fujian
Nanping